Pimelea forrestiana is a species of flowering plant in the family Thymelaeaceae and is endemic to Western Australia. It is a shrub with linear to narrowly elliptic  leaves arranged in opposite pairs, and head-like clusters of yellow, tube-shaped flowers.

Description
Flowering occurs from June to September.

Taxonomy
The specific epithet (forrestiana) honours the collector of the type specimens.

Distribution and habitat
This pimelea grows on granite outcrops and rocky hillsides from the Hamersley Range to Lake Moore (south of Paynes Find) in the Avon Wheatbelt, Coolgardie, Murchison, Pilbara and Yalgo bioregions of Western Australia.

Conservation status
Pimelea forrestiana is listed as "not threatened" by the Government of Western Australia Department of Biodiversity, Conservation and Attractions.

References

Malvales of Australia
forrestiana
Flora of Western Australia
Taxa named by Ferdinand von Mueller
Plants described in 1878